The Lanchester Thirty-Eight was manufactured from 1910 to 1914 by the Lanchester Motor Company, located in Birmingham, England.

History
It was designed by the youngest brother, George Lanchester assisted by Frederick Lanchester acting as a consultant which was a reversal of their previous roles. By the end of 1913 Frederick Lanchester would cease to have any connection with the company at all. 

However as the 38 hp was a development of the preceding 28 hp which was designed by Frederick this car may be said to have more of Fred than of George in it.

References

Notes

External links

38
Cars introduced in 1910